The 2010–11 Boston University Terriers men's basketball team represented Boston University during the 2010–11 NCAA Division I men's basketball season. The Terriers, led by second year head coach Pat Chambers, played their home games at Case Gym and were members of the America East Conference. After finishing second in the conference regular season standings, the Terriers won the 2011 America East tournament to earn an automatic bid to the NCAA tournament. As No. 16 seed in the Southwest region, Boston University was beaten by No. 1 seed Kansas in the Round of 64. The Terriers finished the season 21–14 (12–4 America East).

Roster

Source

Schedule and results

|-
!colspan=9 style=| Regular season

|-
!colspan=9 style=| America East tournament

|-
!colspan=9 style=| 2011 NCAA tournament

Source,

Awards and honors
John Holland – America East Player of the Year

References

Boston University Terriers men's basketball seasons
Boston U
Boston U
Boston University Terriers men's basketball team
 Boston University Terriers men's basketball team